Vijayalakshmi Palanisami is a former minister and Member of the Legislative Assembly of Tamil Nadu from Sankagiri constituency. (2011–2016) defeating her uncle and DMK strongman Veerapandi S. Arumugam. Previously, she was elected to the Tamil Nadu legislative assembly from Veerapandi constituency as an Anna Dravida Munnetra Kazhagam candidate in 1980, and 1984 elections. Again she was elected from Panamarathupatti (State Assembly Constituency) in 2001 elections during which she served as Social welfare minister. In 1985, she was made Khadi and Handlooms minister by then Chief Minister M. G. Ramachandran, only to be removed from the post along with 10 other ministers in 1986. After the death of ADMK supremo J. Jayalalitha, she was briefly in OPS camp along with former minister Semmalai, but soon returned to partyfold.

References 

All India Anna Dravida Munnetra Kazhagam politicians
Living people
20th-century Indian women politicians
20th-century Indian politicians
Year of birth missing (living people)
Tamil Nadu MLAs 1980–1984
Tamil Nadu MLAs 1985–1989
Women members of the Tamil Nadu Legislative Assembly